Girl Trouble is a garage rock band formed in 1983, composed of three musicians from Tacoma, Washington and one from Spokane, Washington.

History 

The band played their first show in 1984, and signed to Olympia's K Records label soon afterwards, on which they released two singles ("Riverbed" and "Old Time Religion") in 1987. One of their recordings, "Gonna Find A Cave" written by Jimmy Radcliffe and Buddy Scott, made an appearance on the Sub Pop 200 compilation alongside tracks by Nirvana and Soundgarden.
Various albums followed on different independent labels. As a side project, guitarist Kahuna plays in a Sonics tribute band called New Original Sonic Sound, featuring members of Mudhoney and the Young Fresh Fellows.

Members

Current members 

 Kurt P. Kendall (vocals, saxophone)
 Bon Von Wheelie (drums)
 Kahuna (guitar)
 Dale Phillips (bass guitar)

Past members 

 David Duet – vocals (1984–1986)

Discography

Albums 

 Hit It or Quit It (1988)(Sub Pop/K Records)
 Thrillsphere (1990) (Pop Llama)
 New American Shame (1993) (Empty)
 Tuesdays, Thursdays, and Sundays (1998) (Wig Out)
 The Illusion of Excitement (2003) (Wig Out)

EPs and singles 

 She No Rattle My Cage (7", K Records, 1987)
 Old Time Religion (7", K Records, 1987)
 Blue Christmas / Sleigh Ride / X-Mess (7" split with Kings of Rock, Regal Select Records, 1989)	
 When Opposites Attract (7", Wig Out! Records, 1989)
 Batman Theme (Instrumental) (7" with Steve Fisk, K Records, 1989)
 Stomp and Shout and Work It On Out (EP, Dionysus Records, 1990)
 Cleopatra and the Slaves (7", Wig Out! Records, 1990)
 Sister Mary Motorcycle / Take Up The Slack, Daddy-O (7" split with The A-Bones, Cruddy Record Dealership, 1991)
 Plays (2x7", Sympathy For The Record Industry, 1992)
 Work that Crowd / Granny's Pad (7", Empty Records, 1992)
 Don't Be Grateful / Cold Shoulder (7", split with Popdefect, Dionysus Records, 1995)
 The Track / Scorpio 9 (7", Estrus Records, 1996)
 Kick Out The Jams! / You Got What It Takes! (7", split with The Mono Men, Gearhead Records, 1996)
 I Know Why Santa is Drunk/Letter to Santa (7", split with The Dignitaries, Unsmashable Records, 2013)

Compilation appearances 

 "Louie Louie" on Stomp And Shout And Work It On Out !!!! (1990) (Dionysus Records)
 "Bring on the Dancing Girls" on International Pop Underground Convention (1992) (K Records)
 "Tarantula" on International Hip Swing (1993) (K Records)
 "The Track" on Estrus Sampler: 26 Excellent Spicy Sizzlers (1999) (Estrus Records)
 “Gonna Find a Cave” on Sub Pop 200 (1988) (Sub Pop)

External links 
 Official website
 [ Girl Trouble at the AMG]

Musical groups from Tacoma, Washington
Garage punk groups
Musical groups established in 1984
PopLlama Records artists
Garage rock groups from Washington (state)
Rock music groups from Washington (state)